Jamaica competed at the 1984 Summer Paralympics in Stoke Mandeville, Great Britain and New York City, United States. 1 competitor from Jamaica won no medals and so did not place in the medal table.

See also 
 Jamaica at the Paralympics
 Jamaica at the 1984 Summer Olympics

References 

Jamaica at the Paralympics
Nations at the 1984 Summer Paralympics